Anaethalion is an extinct genus of prehistoric ray-finned fish.

See also

 Prehistoric fish
 List of prehistoric bony fish

References

 Arratia, GF, "Anaethalion and similar teleosts (Actinopterygii, Pisces) from the Late Jurassic (Tithonian) of southern Germany and their relationships", Palaeontographica Abteilung A Palaeozoologie-Stratigraphie, vol. 200, issue 1–3, pp. 1–44. ISSN 0375-0442.
 Poyato-Ariza, Francisco José, "The elopiform fish Anaethalion angustus restored, with comments on individual variation", Mesozoic Fishes 2 – Systematics and Fossil Record, G. Arratia & H.-P. Schultze (eds.): pp. 361–36. .

Prehistoric ray-finned fish genera
Late Jurassic fish
Jurassic bony fish
Early Cretaceous fish
Cretaceous bony fish
Elopiformes
Solnhofen fauna